Der Nürnberger Parteitag der NSDAP is a 1929 propaganda film about the 4th party convention of the Nazi Party.

In 1928 financial difficulties forced the Nazi party to call off its annual congress at Nuremberg, so the next rally, the last to be held before the party took power, was held in August 1929.

The film is much longer than its 17-minute predecessor, and also features a much more mature Nazi party, with many more brown shirts, more elaborate entertainment, such as a fireworks show, and even a celebrity guest, General von Epp.

External links
IV. Reichsparteitag der NSDAP, Nürnberg 1929, IWF Wissen und Medien gGmbH
Complete film at archive.org

1929 films
German silent feature films
Nazi propaganda films
Films of the Weimar Republic
Nuremberg Rally films
German black-and-white films
1929 documentary films
German documentary films
1920s German films